Babelomurex fruticosus is a species of sea snail, a marine gastropod mollusc in the family Muricidae, the murex snails or rock snails.

References

fruticosus
Gastropods described in 1979